Monze is a small town (population 30,000) in the Southern Province of Zambia and is about 180 km south-west of Lusaka. It is the administrative centre of Monze District.

The town is named after Chief Monze, widely acknowledged as the spiritual leader of the Tonga people who inhabit the district. His palace is south of the town near a place called Gonde where a ceremony called Lwiindi takes place. This annual festival is a thanksgiving ceremony which attracts many people from around the country.

Monze is a rapidly urbanising town with growth extending along the railway line and T1 highway. The town is divided into neighbourhoods known locally as ‘compounds’. There is a substantial open-air market in Monze and a small but growing range of agri-dealerships, shops, bars and restaurants.

The main industry in the district is agriculture, with maize being the most important crop. At one point in the past, the district used to produce more than 25% of the maize crop in Zambia. It was popularly known as the 'home of Zambia's granary'. Although its status as the leading maize producer has declined over the years, the most prominent feature in the town is still the Swedish built grain silos to the north of the town. Although these have been disused for a number of years. As with much of Southern Province, Monze has struggled with drought in recent years - crippling the agrarian economy and leading to significant food price increases.

The town has a significant Seventh Day Adventist presence, although many other Christian denominations are represented. There is also a very small but growing Islamic minority in the town.

Local Tourism sites of significance include: The Mooring Campsite, Family Safari (off the T1), the beautiful Magoye reservoir, and the derelict remnants of Fort Monze.

References

Populated places in Southern Province, Zambia